SSPA can refer to: 

Slovak Space Policy Association, a non-governmental organization
South Sudan Patriotic Army
State Secrets Protection Act, a bill proposed in the U.S. Congress in 2008
Solid State Power Amplifier, a type of RF power amplifier that contains only solid-state (semiconductor) active devices

See also
SSPARS, Solid State Phased Array Radar System